= Piazza Benedetto Cairoli =

Square in Rome, Italy

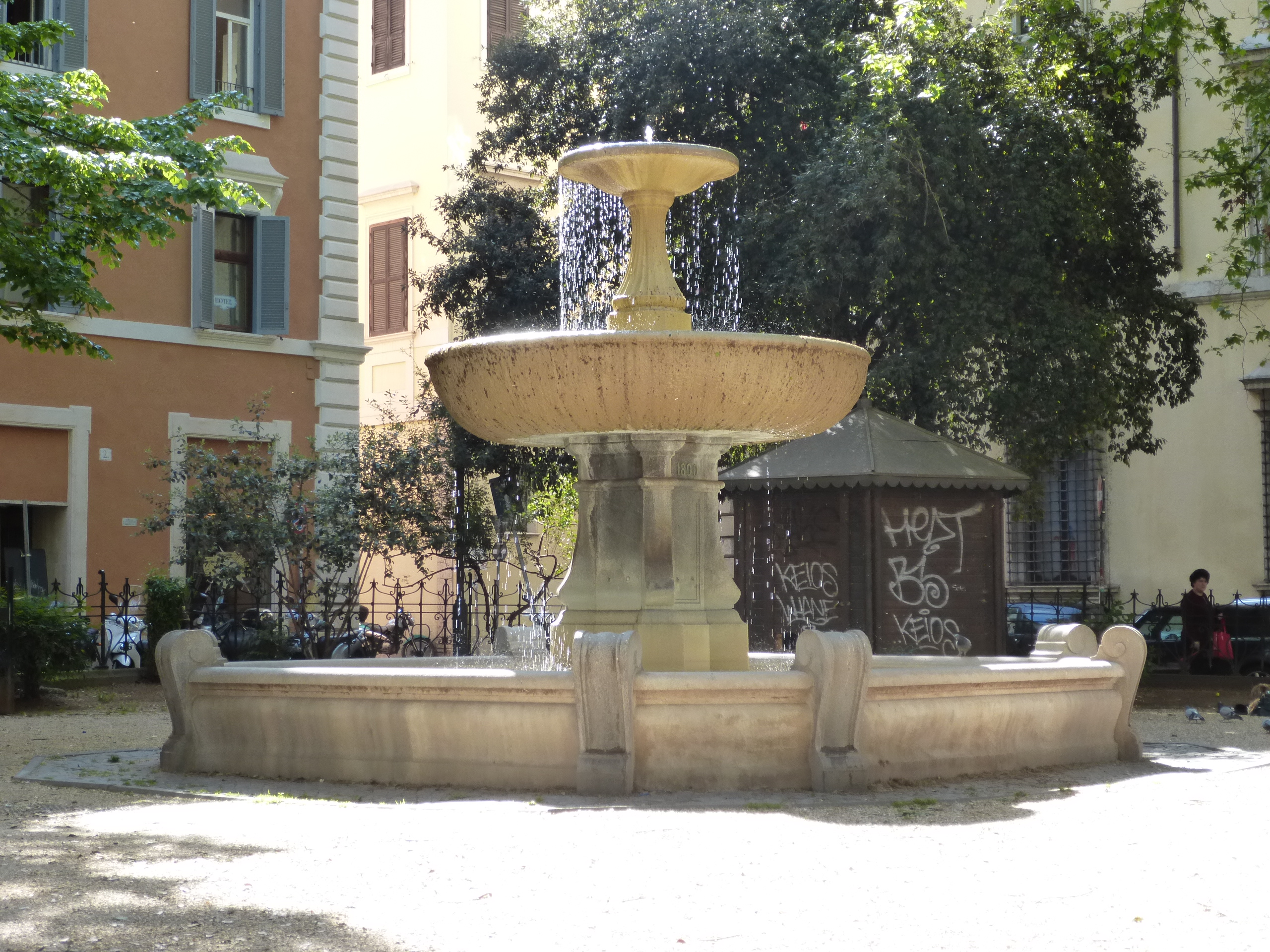
Fountain in the plaza, 2014

Piazza Benedetto Cairoli is a square in Rome, Italy. It has a fountain.
